Elias Lasisi (born 9 January 1992) is a Belgian professional basketball player for MLP Academics Heidelberg of the Basketball Bundesliga (BBL). He has also been a member of the Belgium national basketball team.

Professional career
Lasisi formerly played in Belgium for Leuven Bears and Limburg United. He parted company with Limburg in January 2017 because of a breach of disciplinary rules according to the club. Lasisi then joined French ProA side ESSM Le Portel. He returned to Belgium for the 2017-19 campaign, joining Oostende. With Oostende, Lasisi won two Pro Basketball League titles.

On 22 August 2019, Lasisi signed with BG Göttingen in Germany. In the autumn of 2020, he joined Brose Bamberg, staying on a short-term contract until 30 October 2020. He appeared in one Champions League contest for Bamberg. On 3 November 2020, Lasisi signed with the Crailsheim Merlins.

On August 19, 2022, he has signed with MLP Academics Heidelberg of the Basketball Bundesliga (BBL).

National team career
Lasisi was selected for Belgium for the 2019 FIBA Basketball World Cup qualification games against Bosnia and Herzegovina and France.

References

External links
 RealGM.com profile

1991 births
Living people
Belgian expatriate basketball people in Germany
Belgian men's basketball players
BC Oostende players
BG Göttingen players
Crailsheim Merlins players
Leuven Bears players
USC Heidelberg players
Limburg United players
Sportspeople from Leuven
Brose Bamberg players
Shooting guards